Ankole was a traditional Bantu kingdom in Uganda and lasted from the 15th century until 1967. The kingdom was located in south-western Uganda, east of Lake Edward.

History

Ankole Kingdom is located in the South-Western region of Uganda bordering Rwanda and the Democratic Republic of Congo. The kingdom was ruled by a monarch known as the Mugabe or Omugabe. The people of Ankole are called Banyankore (singular: Munyankore) in Runyankole language, a Bantu language.

Under the Empire of Kitara 
Before the collapse of the Empire of Kitara in the 15th century, Ankole, or as it was known back then, Karo-Karungi ‘the good millet’, was a small and remote area on the edges of the empire.

Founding 
According to legend, the first (and semi-legendary) king of Ankole, Ruhinda Rwa Njunaki, was born as the illegitimate son of Wamara (or Ndahura), the last emperor of the Empire of Kitara. His mother was known as Njunaki and was a servant in the king's palace. During the collapse of the empire, the throne was usurped by the Bunyoro and Wamara was forced to flee to Ntusi where he formed his new capital with a group of Bahima followers. Ruhinda was left behind and disguised as the keeper of the royal drum. After a while, Ruhinda fled the capital with some regalia and joined his father in Ntusi.

Eventually, Ruhinda left with a group of followers on an expedition to Buzinza and Karagwe, where he, according to some sources, conquered pre-existing agricultural authorities, establishing the Kingdom of Karagwe. While he was gone, Ntusi was raided by invaders (most likely the Bunyoro to get back the regalia), killing Wamara and most of the people living there. When Ruhinda returned, he found that only his mother and older brother were alive. He took them and escaped to what was to become Nkore.

When he came to the area, he found that it was already ruled and forced the leader to flee and declared himself king, establishing the Kingdom of Karo-Karungi. The original area of the kingdom was a little larger than the modern-day Isingiro District. He then built his capital at Mweruka but later moved it to Rurama where his first son would be born.

Eventually, he would entrust the kingdom to his son Nkuba, leaving with a group of followers to return to Karagwe. However, other sources say this was when he actually conquered the area now known as the Kingdom of Karagwe.

Pre-colonial ethnic relations in Ankole 
The pastoralist Hima (also known as Bahima) established dominion over the agricultural Iru (also known as Bairu) some time before the nineteenth century. The Hima and Iru established close relations based on trade and symbolic recognition, but they were unequal partners in these relations. The Iru were legally and socially inferior to the Hima, and the symbol of this inequality was cattle, which only the Hima could own. The two groups retained their separate identities through rules prohibiting intermarriage and, when such marriages occurred, making them invalid.

The Hima provided cattle products that otherwise would not have been available to Iru farmers. Because the Hima population was much smaller than the Iru population, gifts and tribute demanded by the Hima could be supplied fairly easily. These factors probably made Hima-Iru relations tolerable, but they were nonetheless reinforced by the superior military organization and training of the Hima.

The kingdom of Ankole expanded by annexing territory to the south and east. In many cases, conquered herders were incorporated into the dominant Hima stratum of society, and agricultural populations were adopted as Iru or slaves and treated as legal inferiors. Neither group could own cattle, and slaves could not herd cattle owned by the Hima.

Ankole society evolved into a system of ranked statuses, where even among the cattle-owning elite, patron-client ties were important in maintaining social order. Men gave cattle to the king (mugabe) to demonstrate their loyalty and to mark life-cycle changes or victories in cattle raiding. This loyalty was often tested by the king's demands for cattle or for military service. In return for homage and military service, a man received protection from the king, both from external enemies and from factional disputes with other cattle owners.

The mugabe authorized his most powerful chiefs to recruit and lead armies on his behalf, and these warrior bands were charged with protecting Ankole borders. Only Hima men could serve in the army, however, and the prohibition on Iru military training almost eliminated the threat of Iru rebellion. Iru legal inferiority was also symbolized in the legal prohibition against Iru owning cattle. And, because marriages were legitimized through the exchange of cattle, this prohibition helped reinforce the ban on Hima-Iru intermarriage. The Iru were also denied highlevel political appointments, although they were often appointed to assist local administrators in Iru villages.

The Iru had a number of ways to redress grievances against Hima overlords, despite their legal inferiority. Iru men could petition the king to end unfair treatment by a Hima patron. Iru people could not be subjugated to Hima cattle-owners without entering into a patron-client contract.

A number of social pressures worked to destroy Hima domination of Ankole. Miscegenation took place despite prohibitions on intermarriage, and children of these unions (abambari) often demanded their rights as cattle owners, leading to feuding and cattle-raiding. From what is present-day Rwanda groups launched repeated attacks against the Hima during the nineteenth century. To counteract these pressures, several Hima warlords recruited Iru men into their armies to protect the southern borders of Ankole.

Banyankore trace their ancestors back to the Bairu and the Bahima subgroup.

Colonial and post-colonial periods

On 25 October 1901, the Kingdom of Nkore was incorporated into the British Protectorate of Uganda by the signing of the Ankole agreement.

The kingdom was formally abolished in 1967 by the government of President Milton Obote, and since then, the kingdom has not been restored officially.

Because of the reorganisation of the country by Idi Amin, Ankole no longer exists as an administrative unit. It is divided into ten districts, namely: Bushenyi District, Buhweju District, Mitooma District, Rubirizi District, Sheema District, Ntungamo District, Mbarara District, Kiruhura District, Ibanda District, and Isingiro District.

List of Omugabe of Ankole

Names and Dates taken from John Stewart's African States and Rulers (1989).

Ruhinda (c. 1430 - 1446)
Nkuba (c. 1446 - 1475)
Nyaika (c. 1475 - 1503)
Nyabugaro Ntare I (c. 1503 - 1531)
Rushango (c. 1531 - 1559)
Ntare II Kagwejegyerera (c. 1559 - 1587)
Ntare III Rugamaba (c. 1587 - 1615)
Kasasira (c. 1615 - 1643)
Kitera (c. 1643 - 1671) (joint ruler with Kumongye)
Kumongye (c. 1643 - 1671) (joint ruler with Kitera)
Mirindi (c. 1671 - 1699)
Ntare IV Kitabanyoro (c. 1699 - 1727)
Macwa (c. 1727 - 1755)
Four joint rulers (c. 1755 - 1783)
Rwabirere
Karara I
Karaiga
Kahaya I
Three joint rulers (c. 1783 - 1811)
Nyakashaija
Bwarenga
Rwebishengye
Kayunga (c. 1811 - 1839) (joint ruler with Gasiyonga I)
Gasiyonga I (c. 1811 - 1839) (joint ruler with Kayunga)
Mutambuka (c. 1839 - 1867)
Ntare V (c. 1867 - 1895)
Monarchy placed under the Uganda Protectorate in 1896.
Kahaya II (1895 – 1944)
Gasiyonga II (1944 – 8 September 1967)
Monarchy abolished in 1967.
Ntare VI/John Barigye, 1993–2011 (Titular king)
Charles Rwebishengye, 2011–present (Titular king/crown prince)

Nkole people

Nkole people are a Bantu ethnic group native to Uganda. They primarily inhabit Ankole. They are closely related to other Bantu peoples of the region, namely the Nyoro, Kiga, Toro and Hema peoples. Their population is 4,187,445 (9.8% of Uganda).People from Ankole region are referred to as “Banyankore”.
The Banyankore speak Orunyankore, a Great Lakes Bantu language. There were an estimated 2.3 million native speakers in 2002.

Counties of Nkole (Amashaza)
Nkore Kingdom was divided into ten counties. These counties are now divided into various political constituencies. But the original ten counties of Nkore include:

Kashari
Isingiro
Rwampara
Nyabushozi
Ibanda
Sheema
Kajjara
Bunyaruguru
Igara
Buhweju

Nkole calendar

The Nkore calendar was divided into 12 months. They were named according to weather conditions and activities done in that period. They include:
 Biruuru
 Kaatambuga
 Katumba
 Nyeikoma
 Kyabahezi
 Kahingo
 Nyeirurwe
 Kamena
 Kicuransi
 Kashwa
 Museenene
 Muzimbezi

References

External links
World Statesmen - Uganda
A tour guide to Ankole Culture - Uganda
Historical map of Ankole
The Ankole Times

 
Ugandan monarchies
Ethnic groups in Uganda